Becoz I Was Too Nervous At That Time (只因當時太緊張) is the second studio album release by the Hong Kong-based indie pop band my little airport in 2005. Song of Depression (失落沮喪歌) was inspired by songwriter Ah P's reading of  Dazai Osamu.

Track listing 
"Gigi Leung is dead " - 1:16
"I don't know how to download good av like iris does" - 2:26
"Because I Was Too Nervous at That Time" (只因當時太緊張) - 2:35
"Song of depression" (失落沮喪歌) - 2:26
"Take me as rucheng zhang" (就當我是張如城) - 1:48
"Pak Tin shopping center" (白田購物中心) - 1:10
"Leo, are you still jumping out of windows in expensive clothes?" - 2:09
"Your smile is like a flower" (你的微笑像朵花) - 2:37
"Spring is in carriage" (春天在車廂裡) - 2:39
"My little fish" - 2:17

References

My Little Airport albums
2005 albums